Krupac is a village in the municipalities of Istočna Ilidža (Republika Srpska) and Ilidža, Bosnia and Herzegovina.

Demographics 
According to the 2013 census, its population was 250, with 13 people living in Ilidža and 237 in Istočna Ilidža.

References

Istočno Sarajevo
Populated places in Istočna Ilidža
Villages in Republika Srpska
Populated places in Ilidža